Green Park station may refer to:

Green Park metro station, a Delhi Metro station
Green Park tube station, a London Underground station
Bath Green Park railway station, a former railway station in Bath, Somerset, UK
Reading Green Park railway station, a planned railway station in Reading, Berkshire, UK